The Acts of Timothy (Acta Timothei) are a work of New Testament apocrypha, most likely from the 5th century, which are primarily concerned with portraying the apostle Timothy as the first bishop of Ephesus and describing his death during a violent pagan festival in the same town.

History 
For many years these Acts were known only through a Latin translation (BHL 8294) included in the second volume of the Acta Sanctorum in 1643.  Photius, the learned patriarch of Constantinople, had read the Greek original and had given an account in his Bibliotheca (Codex 254).  Then in 1877 Hermann Usener edited the Greek original (BHG 1847), which had been located in Paris Codex Gr. 1219 (from the 11th or 12th century).

The Latin version attributes the Acts to Polycrates of Ephesus (c. 130–196); however, the Greek original has no such attestation, thus indicating that such an ascription of authorship was a later addition.  Usener dated the Acts before 356, probably between 320 and 340, and thought they were based on a veritable history of the Ephesian church.  Shortly after its publication Theodor Zahn raised several issues concerning Usener's dating.  One problem was the statement in the Acts that Lystra was in the province (eparchy) of Lycaonia.  Zahn pointed out that Lycaonia was not a separate province until after c. 370.  Accordingly, most scholars put the time of composition no earlier than the fifth century.  Another more recently observed problem is the two named proconsuls of Asia, Maximus and Peregrinus.  Barnes has demonstrated that both these individuals are fictitious.  Thus, the trustworthiness of the Acts as a source for historical information is somewhat impaired.  Nevertheless, the author does display local knowledge of the topography and culture of Ephesus.

Content 
The Acts tell how Paul had consecrated Timothy as bishop during Nero's reign on the occasion of a visit to Ephesus which they made together.  Then, under Nerva, Timothy suffers a martyr's death during a pagan festival.  In this "devilish and abominable festival," as Photius calls it men with masks on their faces and with clubs in their hands went about "assaulting without restraint free men and respectable women, perpetrating murders of no common sort and shedding endless blood in the best parts of the city, as if they were performing a religious duty."  Scholars have identified this festival, called  (roughly, "the bringing down"), with the cult of Dionysus.  As Klauck describes it, Timothy "attempts to put an end to the wild and violent goings-on but himself falls victim to the orgies."

In addition to the activities of Timothy, there is almost as much material about John the Evangelist, who was also a resident of Ephesus.  Usener explains this odd situation as being due perhaps to the material having come originally from an earlier history of the Ephesian church.  The Acts also contain an interesting passage on the formation of the fourfold gospel.

Whereas Lipsius had seen this account as a dressing-up of what was in Eusebius (hist. eccl. III 24, 7), Crehan views it as evidence for an earlier date for the Acts.  He argues that Lipsius "does not attach due importance to the circumstantial account in the Acta of the papyri and of their titling by John, an account which it would have been difficult for a forger in the days of the big vellum codices (after 320) to make up for himself."

Notes

References

Primary sources 
 Henry, R., ed. (1959–1991).  Photius, Bibliothèque, 9 vols.  Paris: Les Belles lettres.  [2nd printing 2003]  (Greek with French trans.).
 Migne, J.-P., ed. (1891).  Patrologiae cursus completus. Series Graeca, 5:1363–66.  Paris: apud fratres Garnier editores.  (Latin)
 Usener, H., ed. (1877).  Acta S. Timothei  Bonn: typis Caroli Georgi vniv. typogr.  (Greek and Latin).

Secondary sources 
 Barnes, T. D. (2010). Early Christian Hagiography and Roman History, 300–303.  Tübingen: Mohr Siebeck.
 Bollandists (1901).  Bibliotheca hagiographica latina antiquae et mediae aetatis, vol. 2, p. 1200. Subsidia Hagiographica 6. Bruxelles: Société des Bollandistes.
 Crehan, J. H. (1959).  "The Fourfold Character of the Gospel," in Kurt Åland, F. L. Cross, et al., eds., Studia Evangelica 1 (= Texte und Untersuchungen 73), pp. 3–13.  Berlin: Akademie Verlag.
 Delehaye, H. (1939).  "Les actes de Saint Timothée," in W. M. Calder and J. Keil, eds., Anatolian Studies Presented to William Hepburn Buckler, 77–84  Manchester: Manchester University Press.
 Keil, J. (1935).  "Zum Martyrium des heiligen Timotheus in Ephesos."  Jahreshefte des Österreichischen Archäologischen Institutes 29: 82–92.
 Klauck, H.-J. (2008).  The Apocryphal Acts of the Apostles: An Introduction, 248–49.  Waco, TX: Baylor University Press.  
 Lawson, J. C. (1910).  Modern Greek Folklore and Ancient Greek Religion: A Study in Survivals, 222.  Cambridge: University Press.
 Lipsius, R. A. (1884).  Die Apokryphen Apostelgeschichten und Apostellegenden, 2/2: 372–400.  Braunschweig: C. A. Schwetschke und Sohn.
 Schürer, E. (1877).  Review of Usener 1877, Theologische Literaturzeitung 2:363–64.
 Strelan, R. (1996).  Paul, Artemis, and the Jews in Ephesus, 122–24.  Berlin: W. de Gruyter.
 Usener, H. (1914).  "Beiträge der Geschichte der Legendenliteratur," in   Kleine Schriften, 3:83–89.  Leipzig: B. G. Teubner.
 Zahn, T. (1878).  Review of Usener 1877, Göttingischen gelehrte Anzeigen, 97–114.
 Zahn, T. (1909).  Introduction to the New Testament, vol. 2, p. 41.  New York: Charles Scribner's Sons.

5th-century Christian texts
Timothy